Ojo del Muerto, (Spring of the Dead Man) was an historical artesian spring in Cañon del Muerto in the southern Fra Cristobal Range nearby to the southeast of the later site of Fort McRae that operated in McRae Canyon from 1863 to 1876.  

Due to the lowering of the water table by wells drilled for water in the Jornada del Muerto basin since the time of the American Civil War, the old Ojo del Muerto dried up.  Lower strata found in McRae Canyon still produce a similar spring just below the confluence of Cañon del Muerto with McRae Canyon.

References  

Jornada del Muerto
Springs of New Mexico